Karadiya Rajput (sometimes spelled Karadia) is an Indian Hindu caste of the Rajput community.

Origin 
While having their origins in the regions of Malwa, Ujjain and Rajasthan, they are primarily found in the Saurashtra, Kutch and other region of Gujarat, India.

Culture 
One of their primary deities is Shiva. The majority of the community is vegetarian; and inter-caste/class marriages are not encouraged. One of their traditional folk dances is the Hinch, also called the Gaagar Nritya.

Jhala's 2010 review of studies on the community noted

Classification 
Karadiya rajput currently classified as Socially and Educationally Backward Classes (SEBC). Karadiya caste Serial No. 102 was included in SEBC list as per Government Resolution No. SSP/ 1194/ 1411/ A Dated 25/7/1994. Karadiya Rajput are not listed in Central List of OBCs For the State of Gujarat, By default Karadiya Rajput comes under General category at Central Level Reservation.

See also 
 Rajputs of Gujarat
 Garasia
 Nadoda Rajputs
 Molesalam Rajput

References 

Rajput clans of Gujarat